The Subaru Legacy (BW) is the seventh generation of the Legacy range of mid-size cars, with the station wagon version the Subaru Outback (BT) being the sixth generation of the Legacy-based Outback range. It made its debut at the 2019 Chicago Auto Show on February 7, 2019, and went on sale in the third quarter of 2019. Unlike the previous generations, the seventh generation Legacy will not be sold in Japan and Australia due to disappointing sales for its predecessor.

History
Series production of the seventh generation Legacy and sixth generation Outback started in July 2019. The first of each model was driven off the SIA production line in Lafayette, Indiana, on July 29.

The seventh generation Legacy is not marketed in Japan. Orders for the sixth generation Legacy were accepted through June 22, 2020, and production was discontinued after that date.

Design
The 2020 model year Legacy was moved to the Subaru Global Platform (SGP), which is torsionally stiffer compared to the previous generation Legacy. Its exterior styling is similar to the previous generation model, but the headlights and the taillights are slightly restyled. The interior now features an 11.6 inch touchscreen on all trims except the base model, which has two 7 inch displays. The screens are manufactured by Denso and shared with the Toyota Prius Prime. There are two separate Denso processors, one drives the infotainment system while the other operates critical vehicle functions.

Some notable mechanical changes include an updated base engine, the FB25 now featuring direct injection, and a turbocharged 2.4 liter FA24 flat four engine from the Ascent for higher trim levels which replaces the outgoing 3.6 liter EZ36 flat six engine. 90% of the components in the new FB25 are new compared to its predecessor.

In terms of safety, there is a new optional facial recognition system which uses cameras to warn the driver if the system detects that they are distracted or fatigued.

Trim summary

Outback

The revised Outback was premiered at the New York International Auto Show on April 17, 2019, and went on sale at United States dealerships starting in Q3 of 2019 for the 2020 model year alongside the Legacy sedan. In North America, the engine options, like the Legacy, are the 2.5 liter FB25D flat four that produces  at 5,800 rpm and the turbocharged 2.4 liter FA24F flat four found on XT models that produces  at 5,600 rpm.

The sixth-generation Outback was marketed outside of North America starting in 2021. The Outback was released in Australia in February 2021, exclusively powered by the naturally-aspirated FB25D engine. On March 23, 2021, TC Subaru Thailand officially introduced the all-new Subaru Outback SUV, imported from Japan. Power comes from Subaru's 2.5-litre naturally-aspirated FB25D 'boxer' engine that produces 188 PS and 245 Nm. The engine is mated to a CVT with 8-speed sequential shift (Subaru calls it Lineartronic) that sends power to all 4 wheels via Symmetrical All-Wheel Drive. The Outback was released in Japan in October 2021 as the Legacy Outback, powered exclusively by the gasoline direct-injection turbo CB18 engine.

Outback Wilderness 

The Subaru Outback Wilderness, launched for 2022 for the North American market, is a more off-road focused version of the standard Outback. It is the first vehicle to be launched under Subaru's new "Wilderness" brand. All-terrain tires wrapped around black 17-inch wheels are also added to the Outback Wilderness. There is more extensive plastic body cladding as well as integrated tow hooks. The Wilderness has a shorter final drive ratio of 4.44:1 compared to the 4.11:1 in the standard Outback. The only engine option for the Wilderness is the turbocharged 2.4L FA24F 4-cylinder boxer engine. Interior changes include orange stitching and accents as well as water resistant "StarTex" seats, also found on the Onyx edition Outback.

2023 model year updates 

Revealed at the New York Auto Show in April 2022, the 2023 Subaru Outback received several mid-cycle changes for the North American market. The front fascia was redesigned with new headlights, a honeycomb-style grille, and cladding on the front corners. Inside, the Starlink multimedia system was updated with an optional 11.6-inch screen and wireless Apple CarPlay and Android Auto. The EyeSight system added a wide-angle camera for the Touring trim level.  Also, the Onyx trim level became available with the base engine, in addition to the previously offered turbo engine.

For Australia, the 2023 Outback retained the same front end as before.  However, the turbocharged engine was added to the lineup in Sport XT and Touring XT trim levels, with unique six-LED fog lights. There, it produces  and  torque.  The 2023 Outback for Australia also received the same interior multimedia upgrades, including the available 11.6-inch screen.

Awards and Recognition 

 2019 Wards 10 Best User Experiences (Outback)
 2020 Autotrader's 10 Best Cars for Dog Lovers (Outback)
 Autotrader's Best New Cars for 2020 list (Outback)
 2020 Good Housekeeping's Best New Family Cars – Best Station Wagon (Outback)
 2021 Kelley Blue Book Lowest 5-Year Cost to Own: Mid-size SUV – 2-row (Outback)

References and Sources

External links
Subaru Legacy Official Page (USA)

 

Legacy (7th generation)
Cars introduced in 2019
2010s cars
2020s cars
Vehicles with CVT transmission
Cars powered by boxer engines